is the second studio album by Japanese alternative rock band Tokyo Jihen, released on January 25, 2006 in Japan through Toshiba EMI/ Virgin Music. The album was produced by the band and Japanese recording engineer Uni Inoue. The album reached number one on the Oricon Weekly Album Chart on February 6, 2006.

Background 
Adult marked the debut for guitarist Ukigumo and keyboardist Ichiyō Izawa, who joined Tokyo Jihen after the departure of previous members Mikio Hirama and H Zett M (Masayuki Hiizumi). Ringo Sheena, Ichiyō Izawa and Ukigumo played a key role in this album and arranged songs while arguing. About Shuraba, Sheena arranged the single version mainly, but, obeying Sheena’s wishes of not wanting to record the single version on the album as it is, Sheena, Izawa and Ukigumo re-arranged it based on the latter's proposal.

In 2008, "Keshō Naoshi" was covered in Portuguese by Kaori Hayato on her first album Pluma, and in concert by Kiyoshi Hasegawa, the recording of which was featured on his 40th anniversary album 40nen. Mada Kore ga Best de wa Nai..

Track listing 
Credits adapted from Ringo Sheena's website.

Personnel 

Tokyo Jihen
 Ringo Sheena – lead vocals
 Ichiyō Izawa – keyboards
 Ukigumo – guitars
 Seiji Kameda – bass
 Toshiki Hata – drums

Additional personnel
 Uni Inoue - recording engineer, mixing, programming

Guest musicians
 Tabu Zombie from Soil & "Pimp" Sessions – trumpet on "Keshō Naoshi" & "Tasogare Naki"
 Yuichiro Goto Strings - string section on "Tegami"
 SabishimiGumi - nigiyakashi on "Himitsu" & "Kabuki"

Charts and certifications

Charts

Sales and certifications

Release history

References

External links 
Tokyo Jihen Discography

Tokyo Jihen albums
2006 albums